TNBC (or Teen NBC) was an American teen-oriented television programming block that aired on NBC from September 12, 1992, to September 28, 2002. The Saturday morning block featured live-action series – primarily in the form of scripted teen sitcoms – geared toward teenagers and young adults, the majority of which were produced by the network's in-house production units NBC Studios and NBC Enterprises.

History

As early as 1988, NBC had been openly contemplating replacing its Saturday morning programming block of children's cartoons with less expensive, in-house programming oriented towards older audiences, such as talk shows and travel-themed programs, due to increasing competition from weekday afternoon cartoons airing in first-run syndication. The idea for a block specifically oriented towards a teenage demographic sprang from the popularity of the teen sitcom Saved by the Bell, which centered on a group of six students attending the fictional Bayside High School in Pacific Palisades, Los Angeles. Debuting on the network's Saturday morning lineup in September 1989, Saved by the Bell was a re-imagining of the short-lived sitcom Good Morning, Miss Bliss, which originated on The Disney Channel in 1988 (the predecessor series served as a starring vehicle for Hayley Mills, who unlike fellow series regulars Mark-Paul Gosselaar, Dennis Haskins, Lark Voorhies and Dustin Diamond, did not return for the retooled series).

In 2000, Just Deal became the first TNBC scripted series not to be produced by Peter Engel since the short-lived 1993 series Running the Halls, and the first series to be shot in a single-camera format. The following year, Sk8 premiered on the block, lasting for one season before being canceled. Both Just Deal and Sk8 were productions of Thomas W. Lynch, who had previously produced several hit teen dramas for Nickelodeon. By 2001, the block was suffering from declining viewership, particularly among its intended audience of teens; much of its audience by this point was from older viewers who had left their TV on after Weekend Today ended, and by its last season, the average age of a TNBC viewer was 41 years old.

NBC shut down the program block in 2002, leasing out its children's programming to Discovery Kids in a brokered programming arrangement. NBC blamed TNBC's failure on the network's poor performance among younger viewers in its regular prime time program lineup, leaving no opportunity to promote children's programming there; the network would have abandoned children's programming altogether if not for the E/I mandates.

Programming
 Saved by the Bell (1992–1993)
 Double Up (1992)
 California Dreams (1992–1996)
 Name Your Adventure (1992–1995)
 Brains & Brawn (1993)
 Running the Halls (1993)
 Saved by the Bell: The New Class (1993–2000)
 Hang Time (1995–2000)
 City Guys (1997–2001)
 One World (1998–2001)
 Just Deal (2000–2002)
 Sk8 (2001–2002)
 All About Us (2001)

References

 
National Broadcasting Company
Television programming blocks in the United States